Ralph Duane Homan (November 30, 1928 – May 8, 2013) was an American politician and businessman.

Background 
Born near Scotland, South Dakota, on his family's farm, Homan served in the United States Army during the Korean War. Homan was in the auction and land businesses. He served in the South Dakota House of Representatives as a Republican from 1983 to 1986, where he represented Mount Vernon, South Dakota. He died in Sioux Falls, South Dakota.

References

1928 births
2013 deaths
People from Scotland, South Dakota
People from Davison County, South Dakota
Businesspeople from South Dakota
Republican Party members of the South Dakota House of Representatives
20th-century American businesspeople